is a summer sports-related Game Gear video game that was released exclusively in Japan. The game was based on comic strip of same name created by E. C. Segar.

Summary 
This video game involves Popeye (from the classic animated cartoon of the same name) and the sport of beach volleyball. The object is to score 15 points while preventing the opponent (consisting of Popeye's adversaries) from doing the same. Despite the Popeye franchise being popular in North America, it was never released there due to licensing reasons that ultimately kept the game in Japan.

External links 
 Popeye: Beach Volleyball at GameFAQs
 Video Game Rebirth
 UV List
 Guardiana
 

1994 video games
Game Gear games
Game Gear-only games
Japan-exclusive video games
Video games based on Popeye
Technōs Japan games
Beach volleyball video games
Multiplayer and single-player video games
Video games developed in Japan